3 Cassiopeiae (3 Cas) is an unidentified star in the Cassiopeia constellation catalogued by English astronomer John Flamsteed. It bears no identity with actual stars observed today. Unlike 34 Tauri, which was the planet Uranus, 3 Cas was not reconciled by later knowledge.

Identity as Cassiopeia A supernova
3 Cas. was initially thought to be erroneous and indeed in 1875, Baily's catalogue derived from Flamsteed's utterly omits 3 Cas. This was the prevalent opinion until radioastronomy. Cassiopeia A, the brightest radio source in the constellation, is within ten arc minutes of Flamsteed's position for 3 Cas. Study of Cas A has shown it to be approximately 300 years old, meaning that Flamsteed may have observed the supernova. Dimmed by intervening dust and gas (the plane of the Milky Way runs through Cassiopeia), the supernova would have appeared at about magnitude six, tying in nicely with Flamsteed's observation of 3 Cas.

Identity as erroneous data
Caroline Herschel noted that a star in the vicinity of τ Cas, HD 220562, fit well with 3 Cas if a common error in sextant readings was made.  Alternatively, the star AR Cassiopeiae may have been observed, again with the position recorded incorrectly.

References

3 Cassiopeiae
Cassiopeiae, 03
Hypothetical stars